The Singer World Series was a quadrangular ODI cricket tournament held in Sri Lanka from 26 August to 7 September 1996. It featured the national cricket teams of Zimbabwe, Australia, India and the hosts, Sri Lanka. The competition was won by Sri Lanka, which defeated Australia in the final.

Background
The Singer World Series was the first senior cricket tournament to be held in Sri Lanka after the 1996 Cricket World Cup. Security threats due to the Sri Lankan Civil War and potential terrorist attacks from the LTTE had led Australia to refuse to visit Sri Lanka for their scheduled match in the island nation. This time, Australia agreed to participate amidst intensive security arrangements. Following their 1996 World Cup triumph, Sri Lanka had emerged as clear favourites. The Australian team was considered the most serious challenger to their prospects. Zimbabwe's struggling, lacklustre performances did not make them serious contenders. The Indian team had come off a string of successive ODI tournament defeats and a poor showing in their tour of England, which led to the replacement of the team captain Mohammad Azharuddin with his deputy, Sachin Tendulkar. The Singer World Series was to be Tendulkar's first ODI tournament leading the national team.

Squads

All three visiting sides had new captains, while Sri Lanka largely retained the team that had won the World Cup under veteran Arjuna Ranatunga's captaincy. Their 14-player squad was largely unchanged from the one that had claimed the World Cup. India had named a 14-player squad under the leadership of Sachin Tendulkar. It featured two debutants: fast-bowler David Johnson and off-spin bowler Sunil Joshi. The squad was being coached by retired Indian pace bowler Madan Lal. Owing to Mark Taylor's back injury, wicket-keeper Ian Healy took over as captain of Australia's 13-player squad for the series, which included the debutants fast-bowler Jason Gillespie, spin bowler Brad Hogg and batsman Darren Lehmann. Zimbabwe's 16-player squad was led by their new captain, Alistair Campbell, who had succeeded Andy Flower.

Points table
The tournament was organised in a round robin format, with each team playing each other once.

Matches

Final

Records and awards
Sri Lanka's vice-captain Aravinda de Silva won the player of the series award for amassing 334 runs in just 4 innings without losing his wicket, remaining unbeaten in all of them. Sri Lankan spin bowler Upul Chandana and Australian fast-bowler Glenn McGrath both took 7 wickets, but Chandana did so in only 3 matches to McGrath's 4.

References

External links
 Tournament home at ESPN Cricinfo

Singer World Series
Singer World Series
Singer World Series
International cricket competitions from 1994–95 to 1997
Cricket